Boreskov Institute of Catalysis of the Siberian Branch of the RAS, BIC is a research institute in Novosibirsk, Russia. It was founded in 1958.

History
The Institute of Catalysis was founded in the summer of 1958 as part of the Siberian Branch of the USSR Academy of Sciences. The establishment of the institute was preceded by the Decree of the Plenum of the Central Committee of the CPSU of May 7, 1958 "On the accelerated development of the chemical industry and especially the production of synthetic materials and products from them to meet the needs of the population and the needs of the national economy".

Until 1984, the head of the organization was Academician , a notable scientist in the field of catalysis and chemical technology. In 1991, the institute was named after him.

Activities
Fundamentals for the preparation of catalysts; basis of homogeneous, heterogeneous catalysis, as well as catalysis with enzymes; development of new catalysts, improvement of existing catalysts and catalytic processes; chemical engineering and mathematical modeling of catalytic processes, automation for catalytic research.

The BIC SB RAS develops biofuel from sawdust and algae and produces nanotubes.

The institute produces aerogels, including a multilayer aerogel for measuring the velocity of elementary particles.

Departments
 Department of Physical and Chemical Research Methods
 Department of Heterogeneous Catalysis
 Department of Unconventional Catalytic Processes
 Department of Technology of Catalytic Processes
 Department of Fine Organic Synthesis and Renewable Energy Sources
 Department of Materials Science and Functional Materials
 Department of Supervisor

Branches of the institute in other cities
 Center of New Chemical Technologies BIC (CNCT BIC), Omsk
 Volgograd Division of Boreskov Institute of Catalysis of the Siberian Branch of the RAS (VD of BIC SB RAS)

References

Research institutes in Novosibirsk
1958 establishments in the Soviet Union
Research institutes established in 1958
Catalysis
Research institutes in the Soviet Union